Kau Nga Ling, is a series of precipitous mountains on Lantau Island, Hong Kong, with a height of  above sea level. It is one of 16 "high-risk" hiking locations identified by the local government. Kau Nga Ling is inside Lantau South Country Park, which was created in 1978.

Name
The mountains resemble the teeth of dogs, when viewed from above.

Geology

Volcanic rocks are widely distributed in Hong Kong and formed most of the highest mountains in Hong Kong, such as Tai Mo Shan (957 m, the highest mountain), Lantau Peak (934 m, the second highest mountain) and surrounding mountains including Kau Nga Ling. This is in contrast to the many mountains in the Kowloon area that are formed by Granitic rocks, such as Lion Rock.

Geography
To the north of Kau Nga Ling is Lantau Peak's summit. To the west is Shek Pik Reservoir, which captures water from Kau Nga Ling and nearby ridges. To the south is the Tong Fuk village area, while to the east is Cheung Yan Shan.

Access

There are three primary ridge hikes on Kau Nga Ling -- West Kau Nga, Middle Kau Nga and East Kau Nga. All three routes are technically and physically demanding, as hikers need to deal with jagged clusters of rocks under exposed conditions. 

Among the three routes going up, West Kau Nga is considered the most difficult to climb, and it meets Middle Kau Nga at a precarious location called Lifeline (一線生機), where only one person could go through at any given time.

Hiking safety
Kau Nga Ling is one of the most demanding and dangerous hiking spots for experienced hikers in Hong Kong.

Many hikers have perished or suffered serious injuries on Kau Nga Ling, so precautions are necessary.

See also
 List of mountains, peaks and hills in Hong Kong

References